The 2021–22 Perth Glory FC season was the club's 25th season since its establishment in 1996. The club participated in the A-League Men's competition for the 17th time and the FFA Cup for the seventh time.

Players

Transfers

Transfers in

From youth squad

Transfers out

Contract extensions

Pre-season and friendlies

Competitions 

 

{|class="wikitable" style="text-align:left"
|-
!rowspan=2 style="width:140px;"|Competition
!colspan=8|Record
|-
!style="width:30px;"|
!style="width:30px;"|
!style="width:30px;"|
!style="width:30px;"|
!style="width:30px;"|
!style="width:30px;"|
!style="width:30px;"|
!style="width:50px;"|
|-
|A-League Men

|-
|FFA Cup

|-
|Australia Cup

|-
!Total

FFA Cup

Australia Cup

A-League Men

League table

Results summary

Matches

Statistics
Players with no appearances not included in the list.

Appearances and goals

Footnotes

References

Perth Glory FC seasons
2021–22 A-League Men season by team